Sikharagiriswara Temple is a Hindu temple situated in the village of Kudumiyanmalai at a distance of 20 kilometres from Pudukkottai. The temple complex includes a 1000-pillared hall and has many inscriptions by the Pallava king Mahendravarman including a treatise on music. Similar architecture of halls (Mandapas) simulating a chariot drawn by elephant or horses is found in Sarangapani temple at Kumbakonam, Mela Kadambur Amirthakadeswarar Temple, Nageswaraswamy Temple, Kumbakonam, Vriddhagiriswarar Temple, Vriddhachalam and Thyagaraja Temple, Tiruvarur.

References 

Hindu temples in Pudukkottai district